The Italian electronic identity card (CIE), or simply carta d'identità, is an identification document issued to any Italian citizen and to legal aliens, that has been progressively replacing the paper-based identity card since version 3.0 was first released on 4 July 2016. The CIE is intended for both digital and physical identification. The biometric information is printed on an ID-1 card and stored in a contactless chip.

Overview

The Italian identity card is an optional identity document that may be issued to anyone who is resident in Italy and to Italian citizens living abroad. A card issued to an Italian citizen is accepted in lieu of a passport to exercise the right of free movement in the European Economic Area and Switzerland or to travel to those countries with which Italy has signed specific agreements.

Despite any government-issued document, such as the passport or the driving licence, can be shown for identification, the identity card is very widespread in Italy; so much so that it is the first document asked and the most accepted in both the public and private sectors. For an Italian citizen, it is not compulsory to carry the card itself, unless expressly ordered by public security authorities, which usually ask for only the identity of a person, not a specific document. However, if public-security officers are not convinced of the claimed identity, such as a verbal claim of identity, they may hold the claimant in custody until the identity is ascertained.

All foreigners in Italy are required by law to have identification with them at all times. Citizens of the European Economic Area (EEA) and Switzerland must be ready to display a national identity card or a passport. NonEEA citizens must have their passport with the proper entry stamp. Permanent resident foreigners with a valid permesso di soggiorno (residence permit) may request an Italian identity card, but in this case the document is valid only in Italy for identification purposes.

History

In 1931, during the Fascist regime, the Kingdom of Italy adopted the identity card for reasons of public security, based on the article 3 of the Law 773/1931. From then on, the identity card has been in service without interruption according to this old law, to which many other laws have been added over time.

The classic paper-based identity card was issued for nearly 87 years until 2018 in Italy, and can still be issued abroad or in case of emergency.

The project of an electronic identity card began in 1997, but the first phase started only in 2001 with a very first experimental model in 83 municipalities in order to identify any technical problem related to software, hardware, manufacture and use of the card. In 2004 a second experimental model was introduced, that was the CIE 2.0, working as a pilot version for future use on a national scale. In 2006 the service was extended to 153 municipalities, but at the end of 2009 just a total of 1.8 million cards was issued. The production turned out to be complex and inefficient due to the materials and mainly to the transfer printing machines which any municipality had to install to make the card. Therefore, on 23 December 2015 the government decided to use a single centralized manufacturing site, which is the IPZS in Rome (where Italian passports are made), and set the specifications of the next model.

Finally, after about 15 years of trials, as per decree of 25 May 2016 every classic identity card with expired validity has to be replaced by the electronic version. The issue of the CIE 3.0 began on 4 July 2016, initially in 199 municipalities and was extended to the whole country until 2018, as the issue of the classic identity card was definitively being suppressed inside the national territory.

According to the Regulation (EU) 2019/1157 of 20 June 2019, the phasing-out of every classic identity card shall be completed by 3 August 2026, because it does not meet the minimum security standards and does not include a functional MRZ.

On 18 July 2019, the Minister of Foreign Affairs signed a decree allowing Italians who reside abroad to request an electronic identity card. The service was tested at the consular offices in Vienna, Athens and Nice, before being extended throughout the European Union, to some countries where Italians have the right of free movement (Norway, Monaco, San Marino, Switzerland, Vatican City) and to United Kingdom.

As per decree of 21 July 2022 which complies with the requirements of Regulation (EU) 2019/1157, on 29 September 2022 there were some design changes, such as the addition of the two-letter country code "IT" inside an EU flag (in the top left corner) as well as inside a square with optically variable ink (in the bottom right corner) and, if it is not valid abroad, a new position of "NON VALIDA PER L'ESPATRIO" field.

Contactless chip 

Like European biometric passports, the CIE has an embedded electronic microprocessor chip which complies with the international ICAO 9303 recommendations governing the characteristics of electronic travel documents and stores the following items:

 Name
 Surname
 Place and date of birth
 Residency
 Holder's picture
 Two fingerprints (one of each hand), only if the applicant is aged 12 or over
The information can be read by means of NFC tools, but anyway fingerprints are accessible just by police forces.

Physical appearance

The card has an ID-1 standard size and it is made of polycarbonate with many security features (such as holograms, security backgrounds, micro-texts, guilloches, optically variable ink), over which the information is printed by using laser engraving technology.

The front side bears the emblem of the Italian Republic and the background of the reverse side is derived from the geometric design of the Piazza del Campidoglio in Rome created by Renaissance artist and architect Michelangelo Buonarroti.

The descriptions of the fields are printed in Italian and English.

Front

 ICAO symbol for contactless chip
 EU flag with "IT" country code
 Card number (for example CA00000AA)
 Issuing municipality (or, if living abroad, issuing embassy/consulate)
 Surname
 Name
 Place and date of birth
 Sex
 Height
 Nationality
 Date of issue
 Date of expiry
 Holder's signature
 "IT" country code with optically variable ink
 Card Access Number – CAN
 (Optional) The sentence "NON VALIDA PER L'ESPATRIO" is printed only if the card is not valid for travel abroad

Reverse

 Surname and name of parents or legal guardian (for applicants aged 0–14, only if the card is valid abroad)
 Italian tax code
 Italian birth code
 Residence address
 (Optional) The field "COMUNE DI ISCRIZIONE AIRE" is added in case of an Italian applicant residing abroad
 Secondary (ghost) facial image
 Italian tax code in the form of barcode
 Machine Readable Zone – MRZ

Trilingual versions

In some parts of Italy where a minority language is recognized as official, the identity card could be issued with a third additional language:
 in South Tyrol with German

 in the Aosta Valley with French

 in Friuli Venezia Giulia with Slovene

Issue, price and validity

The CIE may be requested at the Italian municipality of residence by Italian citizens and resident aliens. The request is digitally processed and transmitted to the Ministry of Internal Affairs which issues the card in collaboration with the IPZS in Rome. The card is sent to the address specified by the applicant (or else to the municipality) and it should arrive within 6 working days. The costs are: €16.79 for the card issuing and €5.42 for fees charged by the municipality, which may vary (usually doubled) if the previous card was lost, stolen or deteriorated.

Italian citizens residing outside Italy may submit an application for the electronic identity card at an Italian embassy or consulate in European Union, Norway, Monaco, San Marino, Switzerland, Vatican City and United Kingdom. The issuing process is the same as in Italy and the card should arrive within 15 days. The costs are: €21.95 in case of renewal or first issue, otherwise €27.11 if the previous card was lost or stolen.

Validity 
According to the Law 106/2011 the card lasts:

 10 years for adults aged 18 and above
 5 years for minors aged 3–18
 3 years for children aged up to 3

and, according to the Law 35/2012, the validity must expire on the applicant's birthday.

See also

National identity cards in the European Economic Area
Identity document
List of national identity card policies by country
Italian passport
Visa requirements for Italian citizens

References

External links
Italian Identity Card Official Site – Ministry of Internal Affairs
CNSD – Ministry of Internal Affairs
Identity Card abroad – Ministry of Foreign Affairs 

Identity documents of Italy
National identity cards by country